Lincolnshire County Cricket Club played in List A cricket matches between 1966 and 2004. This is a list of the players who appeared in those matches.

Kristian Adams (2002): K Adams
Steve Adlard (1976): SK Adlard
James Airey (1990): JR Airey
Stuart Airey (2003): SJ Airey
Nicholas Armstrong (1996–2000): NJ Armstrong
Terry Barnes (1971–1976): TH Barnes
Richard Bates (1990): RT Bates
Ronald Beeson (1966–1967): RN Beeson
Trevor Blades (1974): TG Blades
Stephen Bradford (1996–1999): SA Bradford
Kevin Brooks (1983): KG Brooks
Oliver Burford (2001–2004): OE Burford
Richard Burton (1983–1988): RL Burton
Paul Butler (1983–1988): PR Butler
George Camplin (1966–1967): GB Camplin
Graeme Carsberg (1988): GJ Carsberg
Bobby Chapman (2000–2003): RJ Chapman
David Christmas (1991–2004): DA Christmas
James Clarke (1999–2003): J Clarke
Geoff Cope (1983): GA Cope
John Dale (1974–1976): JR Dale
Jonathan Davies (2002–2004): JR Davies
Shane Deitz (2002–2004): SA Deitz
Nigel Dobbs (1988–1994): NP Dobbs
Martyn Dobson (2002–2004): MC Dobson
Mathew Dowman (2003–2004): MP Dowman
Roddy Estwick (1983): RO Estwick
Brian Evans (1966–1971): JB Evans
Russell Evans (1994–1997): RJ Evans
Duncan Fearnley (1971): CD Fearnley
Mark Fell (1988–2003): MA Fell
Stuart Fletcher (1994): SD Fletcher
Guy Franks (1983–1988): JG Franks
Neil French (1988–1994): N French
Nick Gandon (1990–1991): NJC Gandon
Neil Gill (1996): NS Gill
David Gillett (1996–2000): DE Gillett
Mark Gouldstone (1996–1997): MR Gouldstone
Peter Hacker (1983–1994): PJ Hacker
Jason Harrison (1999–2002): JC Harrison
Phillip Heseltine (1991): PJ Heseltine
Mark Higgs (2003): MA Higgs
Michael Hodson (1976): MD Hodson
Richard Howitt (1999–2002): RWJ Howitt
Austin Jelfs (1991): AC Jelfs
David Johnson (1966–1967): D Johnson
Terry Johnson (1971–1976): T Johnson
Simon Kelk (1988): SD Kelk
Johnny Lawrence (1966): J Lawrence
Jim Love (1990–1991): JD Love
Ivan Madray (1966–1967): IS Madray
David Marshall (1983–1991): D Marshall
Martin Maslin (1966–1976): M Maslin
Paul McKeown (1990–1991): PD McKeown
Norman McVicker (1966–1967): NM McVicker
Kyle Mills (2001): KD Mills
Ian Moore (1971–1976): HI Moore
Simon Oakes (1996–2003): S Oakes
Andrew Parkin-Coates (2004): AW Parkin-Coates
Lee Peacock (1999): LR Peacock
David Pipes (2000–2002): DJ Pipes
Geoffrey Plaskitt (1967–1974): G Plaskitt
Stephen Plumb (1997–2000): SG Plumb
Paul Pollard (2003): PR Pollard
Ian Pont (1990): IL Pont
Harry Pougher (1967–1988): H Pougher
Joe Price (1971): HJ Price
Neil Priestley (1983–1990): N Priestley
Sonny Ramadhin (1971): S Ramadhin
Paul Rawden (1994–1997): PA Rawden
Adrian Richardson (1966–1974): CA Richardson
Geoff Robinson (1966–1983): G Robinson
David Storer (1990–1994): DB Storer
John Sunley (1966–1976): J Sunley
David Towse (1996): AD Towse
Peter Trend (1997–2000): PC Trend
Jonathan Trower (2000–2004): J Trower
Shaun Trower (2001): SD Trower
Stephen Warman (1990–2001): SN Warman
Simon Webb (2002): S Webb
Lesroy Weekes (1997): LC Weekes
Guy Welton (2004): GE Welton
Clive Wicks (1988): C Wicks
Jonathan Wileman (1994–1997): JR Wileman
Paul Willis (1974–1976): WP Willis
Elliot Wilson (2003–2004): EJ Wilson
Graham Wilson (1996): GB Wilson
Mervyn Winfield (1971): HM Winfield
Ashley Wright (2004): AS Wright

References

Lincolnshire County Cricket Club